Janghwa Hongryeonjeon jeon (literally The Story of Janghwa and Hongryeon) is 1972 South Korean Horror film. The film is based on a popular Korean fairy tale "Janghwa Hongryeon jeon" which had been adapted into film versions in 1924, 1936, 1956, 1962, 1972, 2003, and 2009.

Synopsis
Janghwa Hongreonjeon is film based on a popular Korean fairy tale "Janghwa Hongryeon jeon" which had been previously filmed in 1924, 1936, 1956 and 1962. Director Kim Jee-woon used the story as the basis of his 2003 film, A Tale of Two Sisters. The evil stepmother of sisters Jang-hwa and Hong-ryeon orders her son to murder the two girls so that she can claim the inheritance from the girls' father. But the sisters come back as ghosts seeking revenge.

Cast
 Lee Yeong-ok
 Heo Jang-kang
 Yun In-ja
 Lim Ji-woon
 Kim Seong-mok
 Lee Dae-ro
 Shin Dong-hyeon
 Kim Hyeok-su
 Song Hye-kyeong
 Jeong Han-heon

References

Bibliography
 

South Korean horror films
Films based on fairy tales
1972 horror films
1970s Korean-language films